This is a list of consorts of modern Egypt, the wives of the monarchs of the Muhammad Ali Dynasty who reigned over Egypt from 1805 to 1953. The Dynasty's rule came to end with the declaration of the Republic of Egypt on 18 June 1953, 11 months after the Egyptian Revolution of 1952. The wives of the Egyptian pretenders are titular queens.

Before Tewfik Pasha Egyptian rulers had harem (which means have more than one wife and several concubines). In a harem women had two statuses. First are the legal wives with the title of Khanum (Hanim). Only four women can have this title at the same time. The second are concubines with the title of Kadin. They can later be raised to Khanum. There can virtually be an unlimited number of women who can enter the harem with this title. Women mentioned in the list are mainly with the title of Khanum.

Consorts of Egypt

See also

List of ancient Egyptian royal consorts, for the ancient wives of the Pharaoh of Egypt
List of monarchs of the Muhammad Ali Dynasty
Muhammad Ali Dynasty
Muhammad Ali Dynasty family tree
History of Egypt under the Muhammad Ali dynasty
History of Sudan under Muhammad Ali and his successors

References

Sources 

Egyptian queens consort
Egyptian royal consorts
Egypt
Muhammad Ali dynasty, List of royal consorts of